Bangladesh Bar Council is a statutory autonomous body in Bangladesh, established under the Legal Practitioners and the Bar Council Order. It is the licensing and regulatory body for lawyers in Bangladesh.

The bar council can establish tribunals to investigate and prosecute complaints against lawyers.  In 2019 there were five such tribunals. A tribunal may reprimand or suspend a lawyer or remove them from practice.  It dealt with 378 complaints from 2014 to 2018.  Nine lawyers have lost their license permanently and 6 were suspended for a limited period of time.

History
The council was established in 1972 through the Legal Practitioners and the Bar Council Order. It has 15 members including the Attorney General of Bangladesh. It publishes a legal journal called Bangladesh Legal Decisions. Members are elected to the council.

References

Bar associations of Asia
Legal organisations based in Bangladesh
1972 establishments in Bangladesh
Organisations based in Dhaka